is a Japanese long-distance runner. She was born in Wakasa, Fukui. Her twin sister is Takami Ominami, also a world class marathon runner with a personal best of 2:23:43.

Achievements
All results regarding marathon, unless stated otherwise

Personal bests 
3000 metres - 9:09.72 min (2000)
5000 metres - 15:20.75 min (2004)
10,000 metres - 31:35.18 min (2005)
Half marathon - 1:08:45 hrs (2004)
Marathon - 2:23:26 hrs (2004)

References 

 Profile at marathoninfo.free.fr
 Profile at World Marathon Majors

1975 births
Living people
Japanese female long-distance runners
Japanese twins
Twin sportspeople
Asian Games medalists in athletics (track and field)
Athletes (track and field) at the 2002 Asian Games
Athletes (track and field) at the 2006 Asian Games
Japanese female marathon runners
Asian Games bronze medalists for Japan
Medalists at the 2002 Asian Games
Medalists at the 2006 Asian Games
20th-century Japanese women
21st-century Japanese women